Harjesia is a genus of satyrid butterfly found in the Neotropical realm.

Species
Listed alphabetically:
Harjesia blanda (Möschler, 1877)
Harjesia griseola (Weymer, 1911)
Harjesia obscura (Butler, 1867)
Harjesia oreba (Butler, 1870)
Harjesia vrazi (Kheil, 1896)

References

Euptychiina
Nymphalidae of South America
Butterfly genera
Taxa named by Walter Forster (entomologist)